Nongdamba Singh Naorem (born 2 January 2000) is an Indian professional footballer who plays as a winger. He also represented India in the FIFA U-17 World Cup in 2017.

Club career

Youth and early career
Born in Wabagai, Manipur, Nongdamba Naorem was part of the Minerva Punjab youth team. After the FIFA U-17 World Cup, Nongdamba Naorem was selected to play for the Indian Arrows, an All India Football Federation-owned team that would consist of India under-20 players to give them playing time, on loan from Minerva Punjab. He made his professional debut for the side in the Arrow's first match of the season against Chennai City. He came on as an 86th-minute substitute for Edmund Lalrindika as Indian Arrows won 3–0.

A month later, on 26 December, Naorem scored his first professional goal of his career against Shillong Lajong. Nongdamba Neorem took the ball on the wing, proceeded to beat three Shillong Lajong defenders to get into the box, and then went past one more defender before slotting the ball home past the goalkeeper as Indian Arrows won 3–0.

Kerala Blasters
In 2018 he was signed by Kerala Blasters on a three-year deal. He then became the part of the reserve team of the Blasters that competes in the I-League 2nd Division. After making 6 appearances there, he was loaned to Mohun Bagan for getting some playing time.

Mohun Bagan (loan)
Naorem was one of the key member of Mohun Bagan's I-League winning campaign under Kibu Vicuna. He made 16 appearances for the Mariners and also scored two important goals. The deal was done with the swap of Subha Ghosh from ATK Mohun Bagan.

Return to the Blasters
In 2020, Kibu Vicuna took over the manager role at Kerala Blasters. He then also brought back Naorem from Mohun Bagan. He made his debut for the Blasters against ATK-Mohun Bagan on 20 November 2020 which ended 1-0 in favour of ATK- Mohun Bagan.

ATK Mohun Bagan
On 29 December 2020, ATK Mohun Bagan announced that they have signed Naorem from the Blasters on an undisclosed transfer fee plus the swap of Subha Ghosh.

FC Goa
On 26 June 2021,FC Goa signed a deal with the midfielder Nongdamba Naorem.

International
Naorem scored the equalizer for India U-17 vs Chile U-17 in a friendly match in Mexico before the FIFA U-17 World Cup in India. Naorem went on to represent the India under-17 side, that participated in the 2017 FIFA U-17 World Cup.

Career statistics

International (Youth)

Honours
Mohun Bagan
I-League: 2019–20

References

External links

2000 births
Living people
People from Imphal
Indian footballers
RoundGlass Punjab FC players
Indian Arrows players
Association football midfielders
Footballers from Manipur
I-League players
India youth international footballers
Kerala Blasters FC players
Kerala Blasters FC Reserves and Academy players
DSK Shivajians FC players
I-League 2nd Division players
Mohun Bagan AC players
ATK Mohun Bagan FC players
FC Goa players
Indian Super League players